The Magdalena State was one of the states of Colombia. Today the area of the former state makes up most of modern-day areas of the departments of Magdalena, Cesar and La Guajira, northern Colombia.

Provinces 
 El Banco Province (capital Aguachica)
 Padilla Province (capital Riohacha)
 Santa Marta Province (capital Santa Marta)
 Tenerife Province (capital Tenerife)
 Valledupar Province (capital Valledupar)

See also
Colombian Civil War (1860-1862)

States of Colombia
Sovereign States of the Granadine Confederation
History of Magdalena Department